

The North American Numbering Plan Administration has divided the state of New York into twelve geographical areas with a total of 19 numbering plan area (NPA) codes.

New York City

References

External links

 
New York
Area codes